Colobothea hebraica is a species of beetle in the family Cerambycidae. It was described by Bates in 1865. It is known from Mexico and Nicaragua.

References

hebraica
Beetles described in 1865